Spilosoma pales is a moth in the family Erebidae. It was described by Herbert Druce in 1910. It is found in Kenya, Tanzania and Uganda.

Description
The male was described as: head and thorax deep orange, on the latter shading to yellow behind; palpi black except at base; antennae black; fore femora except above and the tibiae and tarsi black; abdomen orange yellow with large dorsal black patch except on basal and terminal segments, extending at middle to the lateral line, and a ventral grey patch except on basal and terminal segments. Forewing uniform yellow. Hindwing pale semihyaline (almost-glassy) yellow; the underside with the costal area deeper yellow.

Wingspan 48 mm.

References

Moths described in 1910
pales